Megaphobema is a genus of tarantulas that was first described by Reginald Innes Pocock in 1901. They look similar to members of Pamphobeteus except for its legs; the third and fourth pairs of legs are much larger and stronger than the first two pairs.

Species
 it contains five species, found in Ecuador, Brazil, Colombia, and Costa Rica:
Megaphobema mesomelas (O. Pickard-Cambridge, 1892) – Costa Rica
Megaphobema peterklaasi Schmidt, 1994 – Costa Rica
Megaphobema robustum (Ausserer, 1875) (type) – Colombia
Megaphobema teceae Pérez-Miles, Miglio & Bonaldo, 2006 – Brazil
Megaphobema velvetosoma Schmidt, 1995 – Ecuador

See also
 List of Theraphosidae species

References

Theraphosidae genera
Spiders of Central America
Spiders of South America
Taxa named by R. I. Pocock
Theraphosidae